Hamid Baghaei is an Iranian conservative politician and former intelligence officer who is considered one of Mahmoud Ahmadinejad's closest confidants. He first entered the administration in 2006 as deputy of Esfandiar Rahim Mashaei in the Cultural Heritage, Handcrafts and Tourism Organization. In 2011, he simultaneously held the position of vice president in charge of executive affairs and supervised the presidential administration.

Misuse of public funds
In June 2015, Baghaei was arrested. In 2017, for the misuse of public funds while in office, he was sentenced to 63 years in prison.

2017 presidential election 
On 18 February 2017, Baghaei announced his candidacy in the 2017 Iranian presidential election as an 'independent’ candidate. but his bid was rejected.

References

1969 births
Living people
Heads of Cultural Heritage, Handicrafts and Tourism Organization
Alliance of Builders of Islamic Iran politicians
People of the Ministry of Intelligence (Iran)
Coalition of the Pleasant Scent of Servitude politicians
Vice Presidents of Iran for Executive Affairs
People from Hamadan